Atenas is a canton in the Alajuela province of Costa Rica.

Toponymy  
It is named for the ancient city of Athens in Greece as rendered in Spanish.

History 
Atenas was created on 7 August 1868 by decree 30.

Geography 
Atenas has an area of  km2 and a mean elevation of  metres.

It is a fairly compact canton, mountainous for the most part. The Grande River forms the border on the canton's north and east sides. As the river moves south, it is joined by two other large rivers, the Poás River and the Virilla River, before turning west again and forming the canton's southern border under a new name, the Grande de Tárcoles River. The western border of the canton is established by a series of creeks and their canyons that cut through the Coastal Mountain Range.

Districts 
The canton of Atenas is subdivided into the following districts:
 Atenas
 Jesús
 Mercedes
 San Isidro
 Concepción
 San José
 Santa Eulalia
 Escobal

Demographics 

For the 2011 census, Atenas had a population of  inhabitants.

Transportation

Road transportation 
The canton is covered by the following road routes:

References 

Cantons of Alajuela Province
Populated places in Alajuela Province